Adam Karrillon (12 May 1853 – 14 September 1938) was a German writer and physician. In 1923 he won the Georg Büchner Prize.

Bibliography 

 Eine moderne Kreuzfahrt (1898)
 Michael Hely (1900/1904)
 Die Mühle zu Husterloh (1906)
 O domina mea (1908)
 Im Lande unserer Urenkel (1912)
 Bauerngeselchtes: Sechzehn Novellen aus dem Chattenlande (1914)
 Adams Großvater (1917)
 Sechs Schwaben und ein halber (1919)
 Am Stammtisch zum faulen Hobel (1922)
 Erlebnisse eines Erdenbummlers (1923)
 Viljo Ronimus: Das Schicksal eines Kassenarztes (1925)
 Windschiefe Gestalten (1927)
 Meine Argonautenfahrt (1929)
 Es waren einmal drei Gesellen (1933)
 Zwei die nicht zusammen sollten, Zwei die sich auseinandergrollten, Zwei die nicht ohne Grund sich hassten, Endlich zwei, die z'sammen passten (1933)
 Der Rosenstock (1935)
 Balthasar Ibn Knierem (1936)
 Der erste Flug vom Nest (1937)

1853 births
1938 deaths
19th-century German physicians
German medical writers
Georg Büchner Prize winners
German male non-fiction writers
20th-century German physicians